The following shows the Resettlement Housing estates in Tsz Wan Shan, Wong Tai Sin District, Kowloon, Hong Kong.

History

Known as Tsz Wan Shan, or Temple Hill, the block design of the Tsz Wan Shan Resettlement Housing was different from that of Shek Kip Mei Resettlement Estate, with room access from the internal corridor. Each room had its own private balcony, water tap and toilet.

In 1980, the estate was split into Tsz Lok Estate, Tsz Oi Estate, Tsz Ching Estate, Tsz Man Estate and Tsz On Estate. In 1985, Blocks 40, 61 to 65 were found to have structural problems by the Hong Kong Housing Authority. All the blocks were demolished between the 1980s and 1990s, and replaced by new blocks of Tsz On Court, Tsz Lok Estate, Tsz Oi Court, Tsz Ching Estate, Tsz Man Estate and Tsz Hong Estate.

Overview

Shatin Pass Estate

Shatin Pass Estate was a public housing estate in Sha Tin Pass, Tsz Wan Shan. It was formerly called Shatin Pass Government Low-Cost Housing Estate. It had 2 blocks built in 1967 and 1968 respectively. In 1973, it was renamed as Shatin Pass Estate. In 2001, the two blocks were demolished. They were replaced by two 42-story blocks in 2011, offering 1,278 units.

Houses

Tsz Ching Estate

Tsz Ching Estate is a public housing estate in Tsz Wan Shan, next to Tsz Oi Court. It has 11 blocks built between the 1990s and 2000s (decade). The site was formerly Blocks 48 to 53 in Tsz Wan Shan Estate, which was also called "Tsz Ching Estate". After redevelopment, the eastern part of Old Tsz Oi Estate was assigned to Tsz Ching Estate.

Tsz Hong Estate

Tsz Hong Estate is a public housing estate in Tsz Wan Shan. It has blocks built in 2002.

The estate was formerly the site of Block 66 of Tsz Wan Shan Estate. The block was the largest in the estate. In 1980, the block was reassigned to Tsz Man Estate. In 1997, the block was demolished. In 2002, 5 new HOS blocks of Tsz On Court were completed in the site. However, they were finally transferred to public housing and renamed as Tsz Hong Estate.

Houses

Tsz Lok Estate

Tsz Lok Estate is a public housing estate in Tsz Wan Shan. The site was formerly Tsz Lok Estate, which included Blocks 4 to 32 in Tsz Wan Shan Estate. After redevelopment, 11 rental blocks were built in the south part of the site. However, the north part was assigned to build Phase 1 and 2 of Tsz Oi Court.

Houses

Tsz Man Estate

Tsz Man Estate is a public housing estate in Tsz Wan Shan. The site was formerly Tsz Man Estate, which included Blocks 61 to 66 in Tsz Wan Shan Estate. In 1985, Blocks 61 to 65 were found to have structural problems by the Hong Kong Housing Authority. After redevelopment, three rental blocks of new Tsz Man Estate and HOS blocks of Tsz On Court were constructed in the site. However, 5 HOS blocks built on the site of former Block 66 were transferred to rental housing and renamed "Tsz Hong Estate".

Houses

Tsz Oi Court

Tsz Oi Court is a Home Ownership Scheme estate in Tsz Wan Shan, next to Tsz Ching Estate. The site was formerly Tsz Oi Estate, which included Blocks 33 to 47 in Tsz Wan Shan Estate. In 1985, Blocks 40 was found to have structural problems by the Hong Kong Housing Authority. After redevelopment, the estate was converted to HOS housing and was developed into 3 phases. Phase 1 and 2 has 6 blocks built in 1997 while Phase 3 has 6 blocks built in 2000.

Houses

Tsz On Court

Tsz On Court is a Home Ownership Scheme estate in Tsz Wan Shan, between Tsz Man Estate, Tsz Hong Estate and Tsz Wan Shan Centre. The site was formerly Tsz On Estate which included Blocks 1 to 3 and Blocks 57 to 60 of Tsz Wan Shan Estate. After redevelopment, the estate was converted to rental housing of new Tsz Lok Estate and HOS housing of Tsz On Court. Tsz On Court consists of 2 blocks which were built in 1994 and 1997 respectively. In 2002, other 5 new HOS blocks of Tsz On Court were transferred to rental housing and renamed as Tsz Hong Estate.

Houses

See also
 List of public housing estates in Hong Kong

References

Tsz Wan Shan
Wong Tai Sin District
 
 
Proposed infrastructure in Hong Kong